Martín Almada (born 30 January 1937) is a lawyer, writer and educationalist from Paraguay. A noted dissident and human rights activist, he was a prisoner of the Alfredo Stroessner regime. He is notable for uncovering the Archives of Terror.

Biography
Almada was born in Puerto Sastre, but moved with his family to San Lorenzo, near the capital Asunción, when he was six. After he had finished his studies in educational science in 1963, he founded the educational institution "Juan Bautista Alberdi" in San Lorenzo and the "Centro de Animación Sociocultural". He then embarked on a law degree and graduated in 1968.

In 1972, he became the president of the association of educationalists of San Lorenzo, a local action group that received support by other sections of the society and positioned itself as an opposition of the dictatorship ruling Paraguay at the time.

Prisoner 
At that time, Almada graduated at the University of La Plata in Argentina as a doctor of educational science. His thesis on education in his home country was sent to the government in Paraguay (an act of information exchange a part of Operation Condor). As a result, Almada's work was rejected by the regime of Alfredo Stroessner. He was imprisoned as a political enemy in 1974, nearly tortured to death, and kept in prison for about three and a half years. His wife was killed (according to his book - after being tortured) as were two of his followers. His wife being under a house arrest, was forced to hear through a telephone her husband's cries as he was tortured. She died after the political police falsely told her Martìn had died and "presented" her a loincloth covered with blood with nails they said were used to remove his fingernails. In prison he increasingly grew anti-fascist and anti-imperialist.

Release 
A campaign by Amnesty International resulted in Almada's release in 1977. Almada admittedly reports his book that this was facilitated by a whole range of organizations: Committee of Churches of Paraguay, the Human Rights Commission of Paraguay, the Episcopal Conference of Paraguay and the World Council of Churches.

He went into exile with his mother and his children, at first in Panama and wrote a book Paraguay: The Forgotten Prison, the Country in Exile about torture he and, most importantly, others suffered and whose names and faces he well remembers, and the extensive network of corruption through which the country was "run" by a dictatorship dedicated to an absurd anti-communism in the practical absence of any communist movement worth speaking of, actually a mask for the suppression of any even marginally left-leaning idea or practice. In 2020, Almada was the subject of book Opération Condor written by French author Pablo Daniel Magee. 

Almada's book has raised debate about human rights all over the world. In 1986, he worked for UNESCO until 1992, when he returned to Paraguay. There he concentrated on the publication of papers of the dictatorship that reveal its repression and torture and in 1992, he finally uncovered the Archives of Terror.

Archives of Terror 

In 1992 Almada and his team has discovered five tons of documents at the Department of Investigations, Lambaré which revealed dire practices of the Alfredo Stroessner dictatorship and links to the US government CIA agent's involvement into Southern Cone countries at the time. He claims that it had provided military assistance to ruling Paraguayan and Chilean regimes. After making the discovery Almada in the presence of many Paraguayan human rights advocates, farm and political leaders made efforts to defend victim's rights to compensation and Justice. Later in 1993 he also protested against allowing American assistance in cataloguing and microfilming the archive.

Awards 
He received several awards for his courage and work, including the prize "Antorcha a la libertad" of the Libre Foundation in Asunción in 1999 and the Right Livelihood Award in 2002.

Paraguay: The Forgotten Prison, the Country in Exile
In his book he outlined names of 397 prisoners held at the Emboscada "Concentration Camp" in 1977-1979.

Publications 

 Paraguay: The Forgotten Prison, the Country in Exile, can be downloaded from Martín Almada's website. Versions are available in English, Italian and Spanish.

See also
Terror archives
Operation Condor

References

External links 
Martín Almada website
Martín Almada's 2002 Right Livelihood Award

1937 births
Living people
Paraguayan people of Portuguese descent
Operation Condor
Paraguayan educational theorists
Paraguayan exiles
Paraguayan human rights activists
Paraguayan prisoners and detainees